Patrick H. Doody (July 7, 1840 – March 5, 1924) was an Irish soldier who fought in the American Civil War. Doody received the United States' highest award for bravery during combat, the Medal of Honor, for his action during the Battle of Cold Harbor in Virginia on 7 June 1864. He was honored with the award on December 13, 1893.

Biography
Doody was born in Ireland on July 7, 1840. He joined the 164th New York Infantry in August 1862, and mustered out with his regiment in July 1865.  He died on March 5, 1924. His remains are interred at the Calvary Cemetery in New York.

Medal of Honor citation

See also

List of American Civil War Medal of Honor recipients: A–F

References

1840 births
1924 deaths
Irish-born Medal of Honor recipients
People of New York (state) in the American Civil War
Union Army officers
United States Army Medal of Honor recipients
American Civil War recipients of the Medal of Honor